The following are the Pulitzer Prizes for 1922.

Journalism awards
Public Service:
New York World - For articles exposing the operations of the Ku Klux Klan, published during September and October, 1921.
Reporting:
Kirke L. Simpson of the Associated Press - For articles on the burial of the Unknown Soldier.
Editorial Writing:
Frank M. O'Brien of the New York Herald - For an article entitled, "The Unknown Soldier".

Editorial Cartooning:
Rollin Kirby of the New York World - For "On the Road to Moscow".

Letters and Drama Awards
Novel:
Alice Adams by Booth Tarkington (Doubleday)
Drama:
Anna Christie by Eugene O'Neill
History:
The Founding of New England by James Truslow Adams (Little)
Biography or Autobiography:
A Daughter of the Middle Border by Hamlin Garland (Macmillan)
Poetry:
Collected Poems by Edwin Arlington Robinson (Macmillan)

References

External links
Pulitzer Prizes for 1922

Pulitzer Prizes by year
Pulitzer Prize
Pulitzer Prize